The Kazakhstan men's national field hockey team represents Kazakhstan in men's international field hockey competitions and is controlled by the Kazakhstan Hockey Federation, the governing body for field hockey in Kazakhstan.

Kazakhstan participated twice in the Asian Games in 1994 and 2018 and once in the Asia Cup in 1993.

Tournament record

Asian Games
 1994 – 6th place
 2018 – 11th place

Asia Cup
 1993 – 5th place

AHF Cup
2012 – 9th place
 2022 – 4th place

AHF Central Asia Cup
2019 –

Hockey World League
2016–17 – Round 1

FIH Hockey Series
2018–19 – First round

Current squad 
Kazakhstan Men's Hockey. 
 Daulet Urmanov (C)
 Agymtay Dyusengazy
 Nurym Karikul
 Meirlan Toibekov
 Maxat Jokenbayev
 Daniyar Yerali
 Arsen Podolyakin
 Arman Yelyubayev
 Talant Almen
 Zhenis Beibytov
 Yerkebulan Dyussebekov
 Altynbek Aitkaliyev
 Tilek Uzbek
 Nurzhan Mukhamadiyev
 Almas Setay
 Yermek Tashkeyev
 Nurkhan Sansyzbayev
 Yerasyl Askhatov
 Chengiz Seitkaliyev
 Rustem Yestemesov
 Miras Abdikeshev (GK)
 Lenur Vishnyakov (GK)

See also
Kazakhstan women's national field hockey team

References

National team
Asian men's national field hockey teams
Field hockey